KIHS (88.5 FM) is a Catholic radio station licensed to Adel, Iowa, United States, and owned by St. Gabriel Communications.

History
The station began broadcasting in 2004, and was owned by CSN International. In 2008, CSN International sold KIHS, along with a number of other stations, to Calvary Radio Network, Inc. These stations were sold to Calvary Chapel Costa Mesa later that year. In 2010, Calvary Radio Network purchased KIHS back from Calvary Chapel Costa Mesa. In 2012, the station and its then-translator, K233BT, were sold to St. Gabriel Communications for a price of $600,000. The sale was consummated on September 24, 2012.

References

External links

Radio stations established in 2004
2004 establishments in Iowa
IHS